The Baldock House is a historic house at the southeast corner of South Elm Street and Woodruff Avenue in Searcy, Arkansas.  It is a -story brick building with a clipped-gable roof and a full-width porch that wraps around to the east side.  The northern (front) slope of the roof is pierced by three pedimented gable-roof dormers, the central one larger and housing two sash windows.  Built c. 1910, this is house is one of six brick houses to survive from the early 20th century in White County.

The house was listed on the National Register of Historic Places in 1991.

See also
National Register of Historic Places listings in White County, Arkansas

References

Houses on the National Register of Historic Places in Arkansas
Houses completed in 1910
Houses in Searcy, Arkansas
National Register of Historic Places in Searcy, Arkansas
1910 establishments in Arkansas